Caladenia attingens subsp. attingens, commonly known as the forest mantis orchid or sneezing spider orchid, is a species of orchid endemic to the south-west of Western Australia. It is a relatively common orchid with a single erect, hairy leaf and one or two green, yellow and red flowers. It is similar to the fringed mantis orchid (Caladenia falcata) but has smaller flowers and has a more southerly distribution.

Description
Flowering occurs from late September to early November.

Taxonomy and naming
Caladenia attingens was first formally described in 2001, Stephen Hopper and Andrew Phillip Brown. In the same paper, Hopper and Brown described two subspecies including the autonym Caladenia attingens subsp. attingens and the description was published in Nuytsia. The specific epithet ("attingens") is a Latin word meaning "reaching out", referring to the calli which extend to the tip of the labellum.

Distribution and habitat
The forest mantis spider orchid is found woodland, forest and heath between Bunbury and Albany in the  Jarrah Forest, Mallee, Swan Coastal Plain and Warren biogeographic regions.

Conservation
Caladenia attingens subsp. attingens is classified as "not threatened" by the Western Australian Government Department of Parks and Wildlife.

References

attingens
Orchids of Western Australia
Endemic orchids of Australia
Plants described in 2001
Taxa named by Stephen Hopper
Taxa named by Andrew Phillip Brown